Philanthropic Hall, Davidson College is a historic school building located on the campus of Davidson College at Davidson, Mecklenburg County, North Carolina. It was built in 1849–1850, and is a two-story, temple-form brick structure three bays wide and three bays long in the Greek Revival style.  The front facade features a prostyle tetrastyle Doric order pedimented portico supported by four massive stuccoed brick columns.  The building faces Eumenean Hall across the original quadrangle of Davidson College.  It was converted to office use in 1956.

It was added to the National Register of Historic Places in 1972.

References

External links

Davidson College
Historic American Buildings Survey in North Carolina
University and college buildings on the National Register of Historic Places in North Carolina
Greek Revival architecture in North Carolina
School buildings completed in 1850
Schools in Mecklenburg County, North Carolina
National Register of Historic Places in Mecklenburg County, North Carolina
Individually listed contributing properties to historic districts on the National Register in North Carolina